The War Office Act 1870 (33 & 34 Vict c 17) was an Act of the Parliament of the United Kingdom. It was passed to allow the War Office to be reorganised. All of the various sections of the War Department were brought together in one building, and the Horse Guards were placed under the jurisdiction of the War Office.

The three departments the Act created were the Commander-In-Chief, the Surveyor-General and the Financial Secretary.

References

External links
 Worcestershire Regiment Website

United Kingdom Acts of Parliament 1870
United Kingdom military law